Vasco Manuel Vieira Pereira Gervásio (5 December 1943 – 3 July 2009) was a Portuguese football player and coach.

He played 15 seasons and 330 games in the Primeira Liga, all for Académica de Coimbra.

Club career
He made his Primeira Liga debut for Académica de Coimbra on 28 October 1962 in a game against Benfica.

References

External links

1943 births
Portuguese footballers
Associação Académica de Coimbra – O.A.F. players
Primeira Liga players
Liga Portugal 2 players
Portuguese football managers
Associação Académica de Coimbra – O.A.F. managers
2009 deaths
Association football midfielders
Sportspeople from Lisbon District